Sally Rebecca Stenberg (born August 18, 1992) is a Swedish retired ice hockey player and former member of the Swedish national ice hockey team. She played her Swedish Women's Hockey League (SDHL) career with Luleå HF/MSSK, Djurgårdens IF Hockey, and the women’s ice hockey team of Munksund Skuthamn SK. With the Swedish national team, she participated in the women’s ice hockey tournament at the 2018 Winter Olympics and at the IIHF World Women's Championships in 2011 and 2012.

References

External links
 
 
 

1992 births
Living people
Swedish women's ice hockey left wingers
Olympic ice hockey players of Sweden
Ice hockey players at the 2018 Winter Olympics
People from Piteå
Luleå HF/MSSK players
Sportspeople from Norrbotten County
Djurgårdens IF Hockey Dam players